David Wendel Yandell (September 4, 1826 – May 2, 1898) was an American physician and soldier of the Confederate States Army in the American Civil War.

Early life 
Yandell was born on September 4, 1826, in Murfreesboro, Tennessee. He was the eldest child of Lunsford Yandell and Susan Wendel Yandell. His father was one of the founders of the University of Louisville's Medical Institute.

He attended Centre College and graduated with an M.D. from the University of Louisville in 1846. Subsequently, he studied in London and Paris.

Career
Yandell was a distinguished author, teacher, and editor. He wrote several books, including The Microscopist, a Complete Manual on the Use of the Microscope, Curiosities of the Microscope, Physician's Pocket Dose and Prescription Book, and Agreement of Science and Revelation.

During the American Civil War, he served on General Albert Sidney Johnston’s staff as Medical Director of the Army of the West. He served in the battles of Shiloh, Murfreesboro, and Chickamauga. At Shiloh, he tended to Union as well as Confederate soldiers.

In 1867, he became chair of science and practice of medicine at the University of Louisville and, in 1869, he became chair of clinical surgery.

He was the co-founder and editor of the medical journal The American Practitioner, and was president of the American Medical Association in 1871. He also was president of the American Surgical Association

Personal life
Yandell married Frances Jane Crutcher of Nashville, Tennessee. The couple had four children, including Mrs. W. O. Roberts, Mrs. James F. Buckner Jr. and William.

In the last years of his life, he suffered from arteriosclerosis and dementia. He died on May 2, 1898, at his home in Louisville. He was buried in Cave Hill Cemetery.

Selected works
 The progress of medicine: an introductory lecture delivered in the University of Louisville, on the evening of October 4th, 1869
 Notes on medical matters and medical men in London and Paris
 A clinical lecture on the use of plastic dressing in fractures of lower extremity
 Pioneer surgery in Kentucky : a sketch
 Temperament: an address

References

External links

1898 deaths
1826 births
People from Murfreesboro, Tennessee
Centre College alumni
University of Louisville School of Medicine alumni
19th-century American physicians
19th-century American non-fiction writers
Confederate States Army personnel
University of Louisville faculty
Burials at Cave Hill Cemetery